Christos Agrodimos (Greek: Χρήστος Αγρόδημος, born 16 March 1995) is a Greek professional footballer who plays as a midfielder for Super League 2 club Olympiacos Volos.

Career 
He started his career with the youth system of AEL, where he remained until 2013. At the age of 18, he left the academies of the team, and agreed to move on 6-month loan spell to Tyrnavos. After his loan spell, he returned to AEL, where he remained for the 2013-14 season. With the beginning of the 2014-15 season, Agrodimos left AEL and joined local team Oikonomos Tsaritsani. After spending two seasons with Tsaritsani, he continued his career with Apollon Larissa, where he was part of the highly successful 2016-17 season, which saw the team achieve promotion to the Football League. As of 2017, Agrodimos returned to AEL. However, in August 2017 he decided to break up his contract with AEL, and returned to his former club Apollon Larissa.

On 26 June 2018. he joined Panetolikos, signing a contract until the summer of 2020.

On 18 January 2019, following his release from Panetolikos, he signed a contract with Apollon Smyrnis.

References

External links
 
 

1995 births
Living people
Greek footballers
Super League Greece players
Football League (Greece) players
Panetolikos F.C. players
Apollon Smyrnis F.C. players
Association football midfielders